Jaime del Carmen Laya, better known as Jimmy Laya (born January 8, 1939) is a Filipino banker, accountant, and cultural administrator who served as the first Secretary of the Department of Budget and Management (as Minister of Budget) of the Republic of the Philippines, serving from 1978 to 1981. He was also the 5th governor of the Central Bank of the Philippines from 1981 to 1984 and later served as the Minister of Education, Culture and Sports from 1984 until 1986. His terms in civil service, covered two significant points in Philippine history, the election that made former President Ferdinand Marcos have his third term and the assassination of the late Senator Benigno S. Aquino Jr. that stimulated the People Power Revolution of 1986.

In between his political appointments to key government departments during the Marcos dictatorship, Laya also served as the first Action Officer of the Intramuros Administration. Later on, his work in cultural administration continued upon his appointment as Chairman of the National Commission for Culture and the Arts (NCCA) from 1996 until 2001.

He also served as the Dean of the College of Business Administration, now the Cesar E.A. Virata School of Business, of the University of the Philippines Diliman.

Personal life and education
Born to Juan Cabreros Laya, noted author and Silvina del Carmen, an educator who were the founders of the Philippine publishing house, Kayumanggi Press. In 1957, Laya graduated magna cum laude with a degree in business administration from the University of the Philippines Diliman. Later, he took up a master's degree in industrial management from the Georgia Institute of Technology. He did his graduate studies in finance at the Stanford Graduate School of Business of Stanford University from which he graduated with a doctoral degree in 1965. He was married to Alicia Laya, who later died during the 1990 earthquake in Baguio.

Professional career
Laya started off teaching accounting, economics, and management courses at UP after his graduation in 1957. At the age of 18, he placed eighth in the 1957 CPA examination. Laya served numerous positions in different government agencies. He rose to the rank of professor of accounting and director of graduate studies at the University of the Philippines Diliman College of Business Administration (present-day the Cesar E.A. Virata School of Business) and subsequently became its dean from 1968 to 1975, succeeding Cesar E.A. Virata who later served as Prime Minister during the Marcos dictatorship.

Government service
In 1978, President Marcos appointed Laya to serve as the first Minister of Budget and Management handling the portfolios of distribution of the general appropriations of the government.

Laya was later appointed as the 5th Governor of the Central Bank of the Philippines from 1981 to 1984 and was the Minister of Education, Culture and Sports from 1984 to 1986.

He also served as chairman of the National Commission of Culture and Arts from 1996 to 2001 and former Administrator of the Intramuros Administration. At present, he serves as a treasurer for the Opera Guild of the Philippines.

In 2010, President Benigno Aquino III appointed Laya, along with pianist Raul Sunico, and architect Maria Cristina Turalba, as one of the board of trustees of Cultural Center of the Philippines.

Private sector
After retiring from public office in 1986, Laya went on to establish J.C. Laya and Co., Ltd., which was later renamed Laya, Mananghaya and Co. L(and now known as R.G. Manabat & Co.) served as chairman of the firm until his retirement in 2004. He was the chairman and president of the Association of Certified Public Accounts in Public Practice (ACPAPP) in 2003 and ACAPP Foundation, Inc. in 2004.

He is the chairman of the publicly listed and Emilio Yap-owned Philtrust Bank, CIBI Information, Inc., Dual Tech Foundation, Inc and Don Norberto Ty Foundation. Laya serves as Director for Victorias Milling Company, Inc., Philippine AXA Life Insurance Company, Manila Polo Club and GMA Network, Inc., the Philippine Ratings Services Corporation, the Philippines-Mexico Business Council, and the Philippines-Spain Business Council.

He also serves as a trustee for De La Salle University Manila, St. Paul University Manila, the Metropolitan Museum of Manila, the Yuchengco Museum, the Heart Foundation of the Philippines, Inc., the Fundacion Santiago, ABS-CBN Foundation, Inc., Dañgal ng Bulacan Foundation, Cofradia de la Immaculada Concepcion and Escuela Taller de Filipinas Foundation, Inc. where he served as chairman of the board of trustees.

International career
Laya was also the president of the Southeast Asian Ministers of Education Council from 1985 to 1986 and chairman of the Ad Hoc Working Group on International Standards of Accounting and Reporting of the United Nations Center on Transnational Corporations from 1980 to 1983. He also chaired the Philippine Delegations to the International Monetary Fund and the World Bank, the Southeast Asian Central Banks Association, and the United Nations Educational, Cultural and Scientific Organization (UNESCO).

Bibliography 
Books and Publications
 Intramuros of Memory (1983) (co-authored with Esperanza B. Gatbonton)
 Larawan: Immortality and Identity in Filipino Portraiture (1988) (co-authored with Luciano P.R. Santiago and Regalado Trota Jose)
 And Life Goes On: Memoirs of Purita Kalaw-Ledesma (1994) (co-authored with Purita Kalaw Ledesma) (as annotator)
 Prusisyon: Philippine Religious Pageantry (1996) (co-authored with Lulu Tesoro Castañeda)
 Letras y Figuras: Business in Culture, Culture in Business (2001)
 Philippine Cultural and Artistic Landmarks of the Past Millennium (2001) (as editor)
 Consuming Passions: Philippine Collectibles (2003) (as editor)
 Tanáw: Perspectives on the Bangko Sentral ng Pilipinas Painting Collection (2005) (co-authored with Cid Reyes, Alice Guillermo, Ma. Victoria Herrera, Fatima J. Lasay and edited by Ramon E.S. Lerma)
 Potlock Hidalgo Bonding: A Family Heritage Cookbook (2006) (co-edited with Adelaida Lim) 
 Herencia - A Legacy of Art and Progress: The Bank of the Philippine Islands Collection (2008) (co-authored with Cid Reyes, Alice Guillermo, Ma. Victoria Herrera, Nicanor G. Tiongson and edited by Ramon N. Villegas) 
 Hidden Treasures: Simple Pleasures (2008) (co-authored with Mariano C. Lao and Edilberto B. Bravo)
 Santa Ana Church: A Historical Guide (2008) 
 Wala Lang: 500-Word Articles on Philippine Life & Culture (2012)
 Philippine Heritage Homes: A Guidebook (2014) (co-authored with Martin I. Tinio, Jr. and Ma. Cristina V. Turalba)
 Wala Lang II: 500-Word Articles on Philippine Life & Culture (2015)
 Wala Lang III: 500-Word Articles on Philippine Life & Culture (2018)
 In Dialogue: The Economic Managers of the Marcos Administration (2020) (co-authored with Placido L. Mapa, Jr., Estelito P. Mendoza, Vicente T. Paterno, Gerardo P. Sicat and Cesar E.A. Virata)
 Wala Lang IV: Articles on Philippine Life & Culture'' (2021)

References

|-

|-

|-

Living people
Secretaries of Budget and Management of the Philippines
Secretaries of Education of the Philippines
Governors of the Bangko Sentral ng Pilipinas
Ferdinand Marcos administration cabinet members
Academic staff of the University of the Philippines
University of the Philippines Diliman alumni
Georgia Tech alumni
Stanford Graduate School of Business alumni
1939 births